Herbert I (c. 848/850 – 907) or Heribertus I, Count of Vermandois, Count of Meaux, Count of Soissons, and lay abbot of Saint Quentin. He was a Carolingian aristocrat who played a significant role in Francia.

Herbert was the son of Pepin of Vermandois and one great-grandson of Pepin of Italy, son of Charlemagne. He was possibly a matrilineal descendant of the Nibelungids. His early life was unknown. Herbert became count of Soissons before 889 and was probably charged with defending the Oise against Viking intrusions. A contemporary of Baldwin II, Count of Flanders he had the advantage of being a Carolingian, a great-grandson of Pepin of Italy, a son of Charlemagne. Herbert controlled both St. Quentin and Péronne and his activities in the upper Somme river valley, such as the capture and murder (rather than ransom) of his brother Raoul in 896, may have caused Baldwin II to have him assassinated in 907.

Herbert arranged a marriage alliance to Robert of Neustria by giving in marriage his daughter Beatrice as Robert's second wife. As a part of this pact Herbert also agreed to his son Herbert II of Vermandois marrying Adela, Robert's daughter by his first wife. Another daughter, Cunegonda, married Odo of Wetterau.

Issue 
By a possible Bertha:

 Beatrice of Vermandois (c. 880- aft. 26 March 931) married Robert of Neustria. Grandmother of Hugh Capet.
 Herbert II of Vermandois (d. 943), married Adela of Neustria
 Cunegonda of Vermandois, married Odo of Wetterau (c. 895-949)

Notes

References

Frankish warriors
Herbertien dynasty
Counts of Meaux
Counts of Valois
9th-century births
907 deaths
Year of birth uncertain